Nataly von Eschstruth (17 May 1860, Hofgeismar, Electorate of Hesse – 1 December 1939, Schwerin) was the pen name of the German novelist Nataly von Knobelsdorff-Brenkenhoff.

Biography
She was daughter of a Hessian officer and was educated in Berlin. In 1880, she married Captain Franz Knobelsdorff-Brenkenhoff, and after some travel lived at Schwerin. She started writing short stories and plays early in her life. Of these plays, Karl Augusts Brautfahrt and Die Sturmnixe, found their way to the stage. Her rapidly sketched novels and stories soon gained popularity and some reached several editions.

Works
 Wolfsburg (Jena, 1884)
 Gänseliesel, eine Hofgeschichte (Berlin, 1886; 5th ed. 1891)
 Katz und Maus (Berlin, 1886)
 Pot-pourri (1886)
 Humoresken (1887)
 Polnisch Blut (1887, 2 vols.; 4th ed. 1894)
 Die Erlkönigin (1887)
 Hazard (1888, 2 vols.)
 Hofluft (1889; 9th ed., 1899)
 Sternschnuppen (1890)
 Im Schellenhemd (1894, 2 vols.)
 Von Gottes Gnaden (1894, 2 vols.)
 Jung gefreit (1897)
 Der Stern des Glucks (1897, 2 vols.)
 Der Majoratsherr (1898, 2 vols.)
 Aus vollem Leben (1900)
 Sonnenfunken (1901)
 Der verlorene Sohn (1902, 2 vols.)
 Die Bären von Hohen-Esp (1902, 2 vols.; 8th ed., 1904)
 Wegekraut (poems; Dresden, 1887)

An illustrated collection of her works was published serially after 1899 in Leipzig.

Notes

References

External links
 
 
 

1860 births
1939 deaths
People from Hofgeismar
People from the Electorate of Hesse
19th-century German novelists
20th-century German novelists
German poets
Writers from Hesse
German women novelists
German women poets
20th-century German women writers
19th-century German women writers